Ella Reseigh Chandler (born 19 October 2000) is an English cricketer who currently plays for Hampshire and Southern Vipers. She plays as a right-handed batter as well as bowling occasional right-arm off break. She previously spent one season playing for Canterbury, in 2019/20.

Early life
Chandler was born on 19 October 2000 in Frimley, Surrey. She attended Farnham Heath End secondary school. She is currently training to become a paramedic.

Domestic career
Chandler made her county debut in 2016, for Hampshire against Leicestershire, in which she scored her maiden county half-century, hitting 58. In 2017, she was her side's second-highest run-scorer in the Twenty20 Cup, including hitting two half-centuries, as well as helping her side to promotion to Division 1 of the County Championship. In 2018, Chandler was Hampshire's leading run-scorer in the Twenty20 Cup, with 206 runs, as well as taking 4/12 against Northamptonshire. She also played six matches and hit one half-century in the County Championship as Hampshire won Division 1. She was Hampshire's leading run-scorer in the 2021 Women's Twenty20 Cup, with 127 runs at an average of 25.40. She played seven matches for the side in the 2022 Women's Twenty20 Cup, scoring 102 runs at an average of 14.57.

Chandler also spent one season with Canterbury in 2019/20. Her best performances came in the Hallyburton Johnstone Shield, in which she hit 153 runs, including scoring 57 in a match against Central Districts.

In 2020, Chandler played for Southern Vipers in the Rachael Heyhoe Flint Trophy. She appeared in one match, against South East Stars, scoring 5 runs. In 2021, she played three matches in the Charlotte Edwards Cup, scoring 27 runs in two innings. Chandler was not initially included in the Southern Vipers squad for the 2022 season; she returned to the squad in July 2022, but did not play a match for the side that season.

References

External links

2000 births
Living people
Cricketers from Frimley
Hampshire women cricketers
Canterbury Magicians cricketers
Southern Vipers cricketers